Paula W. Peterson is an American short story writer.

Life
She graduated from Brandeis University and from the University of Michigan with an M.A. in English Literature.

Her short fiction has appeared in Carolina Quarterly, Greensboro Review, Alligator Juniper, Iowa Review, Nimrod.

Peterson currently lives and writes in San Francisco, where she is involved in HIV/AIDS advocacy work.

Awards
2000 Bakeless Literary Publication Prize for Nonfiction
2006 Dana Award
Bakeless Prize collection, for "Prognosis Guarded"
 Pushcart Prize.

Works
"Shelter", Prairie Schooner, Spring 2008

Anthologies

References

American short story writers
Brandeis University alumni
University of Michigan alumni
Living people
HIV/AIDS activists
People with HIV/AIDS
Year of birth missing (living people)